Ravaliyavadar is a village in the Surendranagar district of the state of Gujarat in India. It is surrounded by the Thangadh, Wankaner, Limbdi and Wadhwan tehsils.

References 

Villages in Surendranagar district